Red gold is a gold alloy with at least one other metal (e.g. copper).

Red gold or Red Gold may also refer to:

Toona ciliata, the deciduous Australian Red Cedar tree
Red Gold potato, Solanum tuberosum
Red Gold (EP), by Red Krayola
Red Gold (film), a Mexican film also known as Oro rojo

See also

 Gold (disambiguation)